{{DISPLAYTITLE:C16H22Cl2N2O}}
The molecular formula C16H22Cl2N2O (molar mass: 329.26 g/mol, exact mass: 328.1109 u) may refer to:

 AH-7921
 Eclanamine (U-48,753)
 U-47700

Molecular formulas